The Nicobar treeshrew (Tupaia nicobarica) is a treeshrew species within the Tupaiidae. It is endemic to the Nicobar Islands where it inhabits the islands' rain forests. It is threatened by habitat loss.

Although previously listed as an endangered species, the Nicobar treeshrew is now commonly found in its appropriate habitats. 

The Nicobar treeshrew was first described by Johann Zelebor in 1868.

Habitat 
The Nicobar treeshrew only occupies the Indian Islands of Great Nicobar and Little Nicobar and can be found on the highest points of these two islands, 640 m above sea level.

References

External links
 Nicobar treeshrew (Tupaia nicobarica)
 nicobar treeshrew link
 nicobar treeshrew

Treeshrews
Mammals of India
Mammals described in 1868
Taxonomy articles created by Polbot